Bois d'arc (Maclura pomifera) is a species of small tree also known as the Osage-orange.

Bois d'arc may also refer to:

Places
 Bois d'Arc Township, Arkansas, a place in Arkansas
 Bois D'Arc Township, Montgomery County, Illinois
 Bois d'Arc, Kansas
 Bois D'Arc, Missouri
 Bois d'Arc, Texas
 Bois d’Arc Lake, Texas
 The original name of Bonham, Texas

Other uses
 Bois d'Arc Cooperative Dairy Farm Historic District, a historic district in Pettis County, Missouri
 Bois D'Arc Creek, a river in Texas

See also
 Bois d'Arc and Southern Railway